The Progressive Conservative Association of Alberta leadership election, 2011 was prompted by Ed Stelmach's announcement that he would not be seeking re-election in the 28th general election and therefore would be resigning as leader of the Progressive Conservatives. With the Progressive Conservatives forming the Alberta government, the winner of the election consequently became Premier of Alberta.

Stelmach provided official notice of resignation on May 27, 2011. The PC Association then announced the timeline of the election, with the nomination deadline on July 15, and the first ballot on September 17. As no candidate had over 50% of the vote, the second ballot, with the top three candidates, took place on October 1, 2011. Upon no candidate receiving over 50% on that ballot, the second preference votes were added, and Alison Redford was declared the leader, after Gary Mar received the most votes on the first and second ballots.

Declared candidates
Doug Griffiths
MLA for Battle River-Wainwright since 2002.
Support from caucus members: 2 Doug Griffiths, Kyle Fawcett
Support from outside caucus:
Date campaign launched: February 16, 2011

Doug Horner
MLA for Spruce Grove-Sturgeon-St. Albert since 2001. Served in the cabinet from 2004 to 2011.
Support from caucus members: 14 Doug Horner, Ray Danyluk, Hector Goudreau, Jack Hayden, Frank Oberle, Jr., Luke Ouellette, Lindsay Blackett, Jeff Johnson, Wayne Drysdale, Dave Quest, Diana McQueen, Ken Kowalski, Len Mitzel, Pearl Calahasen
Additional supporters from caucus after first ballot: Carl Benito, Don Getty
Date campaign launched: February 4, 2011

Gary Mar
MLA from 1993 to 2007. Served in the cabinet from 1993 to 2006. Alberta representative in Washington, D.C. from 2007 to 2011.
Support from caucus members: 27 Iris Evans, Cindy Ady, Lloyd Snelgrove, Thomas Lukaszuk, Ron Liepert, Heather Klimchuk, Rob Renner, Mary Anne Jablonski, Verlyn Olson, George Rogers, Yvonne Fritz, Moe Amery, Len Webber, Teresa Woo-Paw, Neil Brown, Broyce Jacobs, Naresh Bhardwaj, Fred Horne, Dave Hancock, Mel Knight, Ray Prins, Barry McFarland, Richard Marz, Ty Lund, Arno Doerksen, George VanderBurg, Alana DeLong
Additional supporters from caucus after first ballot: Ted Morton, Doug Griffiths, Jonathan Denis, Ken Allred, Evan Berger, Manmeet Bhullar, George Groeneveld
Support from outside caucus: Gary Mar, Lorne Taylor, Ralph Klein, Danny Williams, Steve West, Rick Orman
Date campaign launched: March 16, 2011

Ted Morton
MLA for Foothills-Rocky View since 2004. Served in the cabinet from 2006 to 2011. Third place finisher in the 2006 leadership race.
Support from caucus members: 11 Ted Morton, Ken Allred, David Xiao, Doug Elniski, Carl Benito, Tony Vandermeer, Peter Sandhu, Jonathan Denis, Dave Rodney, Evan Berger, George Groeneveld.
Support from outside caucus:
Date campaign launched: January 25, 2011

Rick Orman
MLA for Calgary Montrose from 1986 to 1993. Minister of Career Development and Employment from 1986 to 1988. Minister of Labour from 1988 to 1989. Minister of Energy from 1989 to 1992.
Support from caucus members:
Support from outside caucus: Rick Orman
Date campaign launched: May 11, 2011

Alison Redford
MLA for Calgary-Elbow since 2008 and minister of justice from 2008 to 2011.
Support from caucus members: 2 Alison Redford, Art Johnston
Additional support from caucus after first ballot: Doug Elniski, Dave Rodney, David Xiao, Kyle Fawcett
Support from outside caucus:
Date campaign launched: February 16, 2011

Results

First ballot

The first ballot was on September 17, 2011.

Two days following the first ballot, Morton and Orman decided to endorse Mar. Griffiths followed the next day.

Second ballot

A preferential ballot was cast on October 1, 2011. Because no candidate received more than 50% of the vote on the first count, the third-place finisher was dropped, and the second preference votes cast on Horner's ballots were counted and added to the remaining candidate's totals. Mar led after the first round, and Horner was eliminated. After second preferences were applied, Redford was declared the winner.

See also
2011 Alberta Liberal Party leadership election
Progressive Conservative Association of Alberta leadership elections

Works cited

References

Bibliography

Further reading

External links
Doug Griffiths Leadership Website
Doug Horner Leadership Website
Gary Mar Leadership Website
Ted Morton Leadership Website
Rick Orman Leadership Website
Alison Redford Leadership Website

2011
2011 elections in Canada
2011 in Alberta
Progressive Conservative Association of Alberta leadership election